Waterford is an unincorporated community in Knox County, in the U.S. state of Ohio.

History
Waterford was laid out in 1841. The post office at Waterford was called Levering. The Levering post office was established in 1836, and remained in operation until 1903.

References

Unincorporated communities in Knox County, Ohio
1841 establishments in Ohio
Populated places established in 1841
Unincorporated communities in Ohio